Chowki Tinda is a town in Kotli District, Azad Kashmir, Pakistan.

This union council has five villages namely Kakanni Bagah, Dikhari, Chowki Tinda, Kalah Athroin and Pnakha. It is located 6 kilometres from Kotli city and is linked to it with a metalled road.

Educational institutions
There are several educational institutes in Union Council Chowki Tinda. They include 6 government and 4 private sector's institutes. Famous are Govt. Boys High School Malhar, Girls High School Malhar, Green Land Public Secondary School Chowki Kalah.

References

Populated places in Kotli District